Bloor Street is a major east–west residential and commercial thoroughfare in Toronto, Ontario, Canada. Bloor Street runs from the Prince Edward Viaduct, which spans the Don River Valley, westward into Mississauga where it ends at Central Parkway. East of the viaduct, Danforth Avenue continues along the same right-of-way. It is also home to Toronto's famous shopping street, the Mink Mile.

A portion of Line 2 of the Bloor-Danforth subway line runs along Bloor from Kipling Avenue to the Don Valley Parkway, and then continues east along Danforth Avenue.

History
Originally surveyed as the first concession road north of the baseline (then Lot Street, now Queen Street), it was known by many names, including the Tollgate Road (as the first tollgate on Yonge north of Lot Street was constructed there in 1820) then St. Paul's Road (after the nearby church, constructed 1842). From 1844 until 1854 it was known as Sydenham Road after Lord Sydenham, Governor General of Canada 1839–1841. The street was then given its current name in honour of Joseph Bloor, a local brewer and land speculator who founded the Village of Yorkville in 1830 on the north side of this street and who was one of the street's original residents.

Sections of Bloor Street near High Park was still undeveloped in the early part of the 20th Century. Sections along High Park required infill to eliminate the natural deep valleys in the area.  On the eastern terminus Bloor ended at Sherbourne Avenue at Rosedale Valley and where once the Sherbourne Blockhouse stood. A small footpath from Howard Street was the only means to reach the eastern end of the valley to continue along Danforth Avenue until the Prince Edward Viaduct was completed in 1918.

The street formerly ended at a dead end west of Highway 27 (now Highway 427), but was extended west in the early 1960s with the development of the Markland Wood neighbourhood. The Mississauga portion was constructed beginning in the mid-1960s, although the street was not bridged over the Etobicoke Creek (the present Mississauga/Toronto boundary) until 1971.

Bike lanes
The idea of installing bicycle lanes on Bloor had been debated since at least the early 1970s. On 4 May 2016, city council voted 38-3 to implement physically separated bike lanes along a 2.6-km stretch of the street. Mayor John Tory stated, in support of the project, that if council sought to make Toronto a "21st century city", it must improve at providing "alternate ways to move people around the city." These lanes were made permanent in November 2017, following a years trial period.

Route description 

Bloor street begins at the eastern edge of the Prince Edward Viaduct, which crosses the deep and wide valley of the Don River. The street continues through to the Rosedale Ravine, marking the southern border of the affluent community of Rosedale. West of Parliament Street, the street passes just to the north of the large St. James Town housing project, which stretches west to Sherbourne Street. On the northern side of this section of Bloor are the forested slopes of the Rosedale Ravine. Between Sherbourne and Church Streets the street is lined by large office towers, mostly home to insurance companies. This area has long been the centre of the insurance industry in Canada.

West of Church the street becomes more commercial and is an important shopping district. In downtown, especially around the intersection with Bay Street, Bloor is one of the most exclusive stretches of real estate in Canada. Rents on the upscale Bloor Street have doubled in 4 years, ranking as the 22nd most expensive retail location in the world in 2006, up two spots from 2005. Nationally, Vancouver's upscale Robson Street tied with Bloor Street West as the most expensive street in Canada, with an annual average rental price of $208 per square foot.

Under the intersection of Yonge and Bloor Streets is the Bloor–Yonge subway station, which is the busiest in the city, serving approximately 368,800 people a day. Above ground, the intersection encompasses commercial stores and condominiums.

In the downtown, Bloor Street serves as the northern edge of the University of Toronto campus, and is host to several historic sites, including the Bata Shoe Museum, the Royal Conservatory of Music, and the southern edge of Yorkville, in an area now known as the Bloor Street Culture Corridor.

West of the university, which extends to Spadina Avenue, Bloor Street runs through a diverse series of neighbourhoods such as The Annex, Koreatown, Dufferin Grove, Brockton, Roncesvalles, High Park and Runnymede. It generally retains its commercial character, and serves as the main shopping area for most of these communities. Numerous sections of the street have named 'business improvement areas' such as Bloorcourt Village, Bloordale Village and Bloor West Village.

In Toronto's west end, Bloor Street criss-crosses Dundas Street twice, between Lansdowne Avenue and Keele Street and again in the "Six Points" area of Islington–City Centre West near Kipling Avenue. Markland Wood is the westernmost residential community in the city of Toronto. Through Mississauga, Bloor Street runs through the residential neighbourhoods of Applewood and Mississauga Valleys, and terminates at Central Parkway, about one kilometre east of Hurontario Street. Central Parkway itself has a 90° east-west to north-south bend at the terminus of Bloor Street, with the east-west leg effectively continuing its course westerly as far as Erindale Station Road, where it curves back north.

Until 1998, Bloor Street was designated as Highway 5 from Kipling Avenue east to the Don River. Like many urban stretches of provincial roadway, it was formally decommissioned as a connecting link on January 1.

Construction began in 2019 by the City of Toronto to reconfigure the interchange at Kipling Avenue and Dundas Street into an at-grade intersection. This removed the "Spaghetti Junction" created in 1961 and renamed Dunbloor Road as Dundas Street to reconnect the broken sections.

Shopping
The stretch of Bloor between Yonge Street and Avenue Road, in Yorkville, is called Mink Mile, and it is the most prestigious shopping street in Toronto.

References

 Bloor Street
 Discover Toronto at ROMWalks
 Bloor-Yorkville BIA
 National Post
 Markland Wood

Roads in Toronto
Roads in the Regional Municipality of Peel
Shopping districts and streets in Canada
Koreatowns